Trigonometry is a branch of mathematics that studies the relationships between the sides and the angles in triangles. Trigonometry defines the trigonometric functions, which describe those relationships and have applicability to cyclical phenomena, such as waves.

Basics 

 Geometry – mathematics concerned with questions of shape, size, the relative position of figures, and the properties of space. Geometry is used extensively in trigonometry.
 Angle – the angle is the figure formed by two rays, called the sides of the angle, sharing a common endpoint, called the vertex of the angle. Angles formed by two rays lie in a plane, but this plane does not have to be a Euclidean plane.
 Ratio – a ratio indicates how many times one number contains another

Content of trigonometry  
 Trigonometry
 Trigonometric functions
 Trigonometric identities
 Euler's formula

Scholars 

 Archimedes
 Aristarchus
 Aryabhata
 Bhaskara I
 Claudius Ptolemy
 Euclid
 Hipparchus
 Madhava of Sangamagrama
 Ptolemy
 Pythagoras
 Regiomontanus

History 

 Aristarchus's inequality
 Bhaskara I's sine approximation formula
 Greek astronomy 
 Indian astronomy
 Jyā, koti-jyā and utkrama-jyā
 Madhava's sine table
 Ptolemy's table of chords
 Rule of marteloio
 Āryabhaṭa's sine table

Fields 

Uses of trigonometry
 Acoustics
 Architecture
 Astronomy
 Biology
 Cartography
 Chemistry
 Civil engineering
 Computer graphics
 Cryptography
 Crystallography
 Economics
 Electrical engineering
 Electronics
 Game development
 Geodesy
 Mechanical engineering
 Medical imaging
 Meteorology
 Music theory
 Number theory
 Oceanography
 Optics
 Pharmacy
 Phonetics
 Physical science
 Probability theory
 Seismology
 Statistics
 Surveying

Physics 

 Abbe sine condition
 Greninger chart
 Phasor
 Snell's law

Astronomy 

 Equant
 Parallax
 Dialing scales

Chemistry 

 Greninger chart

Geography, geodesy, and land surveying 

 Hansen's problem
 Snellius–Pothenot problem
 Great-circle distance – how to find that distance if one knows the latitude and longitude.
 Resection (orientation)
 Vincenty's formulae
 Geographic distance
 Triangulation in three dimensions

Navigation 

 Haversine formula
 Rule of marteloio

Engineering 

 Belt problem
 Phase response
 Phasor
 Rake (angle)

Analog devices 

 Dialing scales
 Gunter's quadrant
 Gunter's scale
 Protractor
 Scale of chords

Calculus 

 Inverse trigonometric functions
 List of integrals of trigonometric functions
 List of integrals of inverse trigonometric functions
 Regiomontanus' angle maximization problem
 Tangent half-angle substitution
 Trigonometric integral
 Trigonometric substitution
 Applications 
 Fourier transform
 Wave equation

Other areas of mathematics 

 For examples of trigonometric functions as generating functions in combinatorics, see Alternating permutation.
 Dirichlet kernel
 Euler's formula
 Exact trigonometric values
 Exponential sum
 Trigonometric integral
 Trigonometric polynomial
 Trigonometric series

Geometric foundations 

 Altern base
 Angle
 Plane angle
 Solid angle
 Spherical angle
 Right angle
 Angle excess
 Angular distance
 Angular unit
 Degree (angle)
 Gon (angle) (aka Grad, Gradian)
 Radian
 Turn (angle)
 Brocard points
 Chord (geometry)
 Circle (also see List of circle topics)
 Unit circle
 Hypotenuse
 Opposites post
  (pi)
 Ptolemy's theorem
 Pythagorean theorem
 Regiomontanus' angle maximization problem
 Thales' theorem
 Trigonometric function
 Trigonometry of a tetrahedron
 Triangle (also see List of triangle topics)

Trigonometric functions 

 Sine, Cosine, Tangent (trigonometric function), Cotangent, Secant (trigonometric function), Cosecant – see Trigonometric function
 atan2
 cis—see Euler's formula
 Cofunction
 Exsecant
 Gudermannian function
 Inverse trigonometric functions
 Jyā, koti-jyā and utkrama-jyā
 Versine

Trigonometric identities 

Trigonometric identity (list)
 De Moivre's formula
 Euler's formula
 Hermite's cotangent identity
 Lagrange's trigonometric identities
 Morrie's law
 Proofs of trigonometric identities
 Pythagorean trigonometric identity
 Tangent half-angle formula

Solution of triangles 

Solution of triangles
 Law of sines
 Law of cosines
 Law of tangents
 Law of cotangents
 Mollweide's formula

More advanced trigonometric concepts and methods 

 Chebyshev polynomials
 Conway triangle notation
 Exact trigonometric constants
 Generalized trigonometry
 Gudermannian function
 Lissajous curve
 Polar sine
 Rational trigonometry
 Spread polynomials

Numerical mathematics 

 Abbe error
 Hypot
 Prosthaphaeresis
 Trigonometric interpolation
 Kunstweg, an algorithm for computing sines, introduced in the late 1500s

Trigonometric tables 

Trigonometric tables
 Generating trigonometric tables
 Āryabhaṭa's sine table
 Bhaskara I's sine approximation formula
 Madhava's sine table
 Ptolemy's table of chords, written in the second century A.D.
 Rule of marteloio
 Canon Sinuum, listing sines at increments of two arcseconds, published in the late 1500s

Spherical trigonometry 

Spherical trigonometry
 Half-side formula
 Haversine formula

Mnemonics 

mnemonics in trigonometry
All Students Take Calculus

Lists 

 List of integrals of trigonometric functions
 List of integrals of inverse trigonometric functions
 List of trigonometric identities
 Table of mathematical symbols

See also

 Algebra
 Hyperbolic function
 List of exponential topics
 Outline of geometry
 Precalculus
 Spherical geometry
 Table of mathematical symbols

External links 

 An introduction to trigonometry
 Benjamin Banneker's Trigonometry Puzzle at Convergence
 Dave's short trig course
 Trigonometric Delights, by Eli Maor, Princeton University Press, 1998.  Ebook version, in PDF format, full text presented.
 Trigonometry by Alfred Monroe Kenyon and Louis Ingold, The Macmillan Company, 1914. In images, full text presented.
 Trigonometry FAQ
 Trigonometry on Mathwords.com index of trigonometry entries on Mathwords.com
 Trigonometry on PlainMath.net Trigonometry Articles from PlainMath.Net

Trigonometry
Trigonometry
 1
Trigonometry